Rover Scouts, Rovers, Rover Scouting or Rovering is a program associated with some Scouting organizations for adult men and women.  A group of Rovers is called a 'Rover Crew'.

Rovers was originated by The Boy Scouts Association in the United Kingdom in 1918 to provide a program for young men who had grown up beyond the age range of the Boy Scouts. It was adopted by many other Scouting organisations.

Many Scouting organisations, including The Scout Association in the UK, no longer include a Rover program.  Some have replaced it with other programs while others, including Traditional Scouting organisations, maintain the original program.  The Baden-Powell Award still forms the Rover award scheme in associations in several countries including Australia, Canada, New Zealand, South Africa, India, Pakistan, Hong Kong and Singapore, and for several of the traditional Scouting associations that retained Rover Scouting.

Origins
The Rover program had its origins in two different schemes. The first, aimed at Boy Scouts in the United Kingdom who were aged between 15 and 18 years old, was called "Senior Scouts" which was launched in March 1917 during World War I. It quickly became apparent that there weren't enough adult male leaders available in wartime, and it was several decades before the Senior Scout program was established. The second scheme was the series of 'Battlefield Scout Huts' provided for the recreation of British and Empire soldiers in rear areas of the Western Front. Related to these was the St George's Scout Club for servicemen, which operated in the English garrison town of Colchester under the leadership of "Uncle" H. Geoffrey Elwes. From these projects, it became apparent that there was a need for a Scouting-related program that catered for young men, many of whom would shortly be returning from the war.

The first mention of the term "Rover Scouts" was by Sir Robert Baden-Powell in The Boy Scouts Headquarters Gazette in August 1918. The booklet "Rules for Rover Scouts" was issued in September 1918, and the scheme was fully established by November 1919. Baden-Powell set about writing a handbook for the new scheme, which was published in 1922 as Rovering to Success. It contained Baden-Powell's philosophy for a happy adult life as well as ideas for activities that Rover Scouts could organise for themselves. It was translated into many other languages and still remains in print in English today, as well as being available in online versions.

Rovering spread to many other countries following its inception in Britain in 1918, although it no longer exists in the Scout Association. Today, the Rover section remains an important program of Scouting organizations in many European countries, in most member countries of the Commonwealth of Nations (e.g., Canada, Australia, New Zealand, South Africa, India, Malaysia, Singapore and Hong Kong), across Central and South America, the Middle East and in many other countries such as Ireland, Japan, Republic of China/Taiwan, Indonesia, Thailand and Korea. New Zealand Rovers, in particular, hold a National Moot every year over the Easter holiday weekend where international participants are always openly welcomed.

Rover Scouting continued among the troops during the Second World War, even in Prisoner of War (POW) camps.  Some artifacts of the Rover Crew at Changi (Singapore), including the crew flag, have been preserved; they are now held by the Scout Heritage Centre of Scouts Australia in Victoria, Australia. Additionally there is an ornate investiture certificate from the Changi Rover Crew in the Changi exhibit in the Australian War Memorial in Canberra.

Age range 

In his 1922 book, Rovering to Success, Baden-Powell wrote that Rovers "are in point of fact a senior branch of the Boy Scout Movement—young men of over seventeen years of age", "In order to be admitted to a Rover Crew you must be 17, but preferably 18, years of age...." and that Rover training "gives the older boy an aim for remaining under helpful influences at the difficult time of his life when he is just entering on manhood." Baden-Powell repeatedly referred to Rovers as "young men". The 1938 edition of PO&R in the United Kingdom states that "Rover Scouting covers the period during which the young man is 'finding himself,' i.e., developing his character and his powers by training them...." While the program was clearly aimed at young men, an upper age was not specified.

Today in most Scouting organizations that operate a Rover program, Rovers starts in the late teens and has an age limit in the mid-20s (see Age groups in Scouting and Guiding). For major international events like the World Scout Moot, participants typically must be 18–25 years old at the time of the event.

In some Scouting organizations, particularly Traditional Scouting associations, Rovering has no upper age limit. Rover may remain Rovers at any age and in some cases adults of any age may join Rovering. In the Baden-Powell Service Association (United States), all adult members are classed as Rovers.

Around the world 
Rover Scouts International

Australia 

In Scouts Australia, the Rover section includes young men and women between 18 years to 25 years of age inclusive. Though it is small in numbers, it provides a source of leader support and other service for the association, as well as a whole range of activity opportunities for its members.

Unlike The Scout Association in the United Kingdom, where Rovers were disbanded after the Advance Party Report in the mid-1960s, Rovers in The Scout Association of Australia resisted attempts to abolish the program, or even reduce the program age range as advocated in the "Design for Tomorrow" Committee's report in 1970. Rovers  threatened to pull out of Scouting entirely, surrendering the Rover Chalet on Victoria's High Plains and resigning as leaders and assessors for younger sections.  The Scout Association of Australia did however change its Rover Scout program, including the name to 'Rovers', admitting women in 1975, and updating the Baden-Powell Award Scheme.

Self-government of Rover Crews, came about in the mid-1970s following the Georges River Experiment (named after a District Rover Crew in New South Wales). Rovers demonstrated that they could govern themselves, as their leaders stepped back to become Rover Advisers.

Australian Rovers provide active service to all sections.. Service in the community is also valued, with many Branch Rover Councils (the governing bodies for Rovers in each state and territory) making annual awards to Crews and individuals who provide exemplary service to the community and/or Scouting.

Another noteworthy feature of the Australian Rover section is the existence of "Lone" Rover Crews in several states, drawing their membership from across the rural parts of the country, or from Rovers who (because of shiftwork, military service or other reasons) cannot be members of regular Rover Crews. Meetings are held by correspondence, with opportunities to get together at an annual Crew camp and major state or national Rover activities.

National Rover Moots are held every three years in Australia.

In 2008, the Rover section marked its 90th birthday, together with the 100th anniversary of Scouting in Australia.

In 2018, a variety of activities and celebrations took place to mark the Centenary year of the Rover section.

From 2018, after several years of surveying and development, a new Youth Program began trials in most states. This encompassed all youth sections, including Rovers. The new Youth Program was then progressively rolled out across Australian Scouting from 2019, with implementation schedules varying from state to state. Some key changes were reverting to the name "Rover Scouts", formations to be called a "Unit" (in common with all youth sections) in place of a "Crew", dropping the section's motto of "Service" which was replaced by "Beyond the Horizon", reference to service changed to "community involvement" and its removal as the section's central ethos, dropping the knighthood theme of Knights and Squires, and a total change to the Baden-Powell Scout Award scheme (now the peak award in an "achievement pathway") to align it to the same structure as the younger sections. As would be expected in a section with 100 years of well-established traditions, not all the changes were enthusiastically embraced, with many Rovers retaining use of traditional terminology, and the service ethos in particular.

Canada

Scouts Canada 

Rovers (men and women ages 18–26) is part of the Scouts Canada program. The Rover program is the final stage in Canadian Scouting after the Venturer (ages 14–17) program.  Following the major program reviews for the Cub and Scout sections in the mid-1960s, the Canadian Rover program was reviewed and overhauled in 1971.  Part of this initiative involved a three-year experiment to allow young women to join the Rover Section.  Each crew had the option of voting to become a co-ed crew for the duration of the experiment.  At the end of the three years, a survey of all 2850 Rovers in Canada was conducted, and the co-ed option was overwhelmingly adopted in 1974.  Scouts Canada became a fully co-educational organization in 1998.

Rover Scouts in Canada have modernized the program by adopting different themes to their program, much like the traditional St George theme.  Examples would include "MedRover crews" that focus on First Aid, Leadership and Management training such as the 180th Pacific Coast Rover Crew, however crews are welcome to create any structure that works for them.

Baden-Powell Service Association 

Rover Knights are the Baden-Powell Service Association equivalent and is open to all adults (18+). It is the final stage after Senior Explorers (ages 14–17), and is open to both males and females as well. Informally, the term Knights is usually dropped and the section is referred to simply as Rovers.

The outdoors is an essential part of both Rover programs.  Rovers often participate in adventurous activities like mountain climbing, white water rafting, or para-sailing. Rovers also help their local communities by running service activities such as food drives, park clean-ups, and tree plantings. Rovers meet in a group called a Crew.  Rovers develop and manage their own program under the mentorship of a respected advisor.  Rovers adhere to the promise that is used in the Scout section onwards, and the motto "Service".

Japan 

Rovers in Japan are usually, but not always, attached to local universities, such as Keio and Waseda. The program is seeing growth, in part due to rising dues in the similarly-aged Venture Scout program. The most recently created group is Takamatsu 15, attached to Takamatsu University on Shikoku.

New Zealand 
Rovers is part of the Scouts Aotearoa programme. While the section is small in number, with around 200 members as of 2021, it contributes a large number of service hours both to Scouting and the wider community, with most members additionally being leaders in other sections. Rovers maintain a range of facilities and lodges at campgrounds around the country.

The National Rover Moot is held annually over Easter weekend, with around 200 participants from around New Zealand and Australia attending.

Philippines

Boy Scouts of the Philippines 

Rovering started in the Philippines when the Boy Scouts of the Philippines (BSP) separated from the Boy Scouts of America on 31 October 1936. However, following the Chief Scouts' Advance Party Report in 1966, the section was discontinued in the Philippines, and was replaced by a different programme.

The Advance Party Report caused some disquiet amongst some leaders who believed that Scouting was progressing away from its traditional roots, and the Philippines was no different from other organizations affected by the programme changes in the late 1960s. As with countries like the United Kingdom, this led to the creation of independent Scouting organizations which continues the traditional Rover Scout programme.

In 1990, the BSP resumed a Rovering programme for men and women of 16 to 24 years in age, although there are considerable differences to the original programme. There is also a Rover Peers section for those over the age of 25.

Rovers Philippines 
On 18 July 2008, a national Rover Scouting network was established through the internet, a national network of Rover Leaders and Scouts in the Philippines. The members are affiliated with the Boy Scouts of the Philippines and the group is a founding national Rover organization in the Rover Scouts International. The dynamic network aims to promote the brotherhood of the open air and service by providing an avenue for a relevant journey of young people of Rovering age from their adolescence to responsible adulthood.

Rovers Philippines hosted the 1st Rovers Scouts International Fellowship in the 36th Asia Pacific Regional Jamboree in Mt. Makiling, Philippines with the Scouts Canada, Malaysia and Brunei. The occasion was spearheaded by the Rover Circles/Crews of RoversPhil- Davao City Rovers, Butuan City FSUU Rovers, Surigao Maradyaw Karadyaw Rovers, San Dionisio Rovers, Sacred Heart Rovers of Quezon City, SMNHS Rovers of Rizal Council, and Marikina.

The Boy Scout of the Philippines Negros Oriental-Siquijor Council welcomed 70 Rover Scouts in ceremonies held on Nov. 23,2018 at the BSP Scout Jojo Magbanua Hall in Dumaguete City. The new Rover Scouts are from Silliman University Rover Scout Circle 01, Negros Oriental State University, Bayawan City National High School, St. Paul University Dumaguete, Bayawan City Science and Technology Education Center, Bais City National High School, Foundation University and Junob National High School.

On 12 December 2009, the leaders of the network elected its national committee which named the network as Rovers Philippines with the netname RoversPhil.

Independent Rover Crews 

On 12 December 2004, a number of Rover Scouts and Leaders grouped together and formed the Philippine Liahona Rover Crew as an affiliate of the Rover Scout Association. The crew became affiliated with the Baden-Powell Movement of Australia (BPSA-Australia) on 14 August 2005 and started to promote traditional Scouting programme to the younger sections.

In 2006, another independent group of Rover Scouts became part of the Rover Explorer Scouts Association, which is headquartered in the United Kingdom (the International HQ). This group was started as a single Rover Crew on 21 April 2006 when their Rover Mate and founder of the group was invested as a Rover Scout. In the same year, the group gained recognition as a recognised council or branch office of the association in the Philippines.  The Rover Explorer Scouts Association-Philippine Council was formed and recognised in August 2006.  The region has also adopted a local group from the United Kingdom, the Pathfinder Scouts Association (PSA).  The methodology, practices, programmes and beliefs of the associations are based on the 1907 original Scouting programme and the pre-Advance Party Report 1966.

Both associations were founded by the Filipinos who are living in the Philippines through the help and assistance of Americans, Australians and British Scouts and Scouters who believe in Traditional Scouting and the pre-1967 Scouting programme as laid down by B-P in his books Rovering to Success and Scouting for Boys.

United Kingdom

The Scout Association 
Rover Scouts is no longer an active part of The Scout Association, having been replaced in the late 1960s by the Venture Scout programme, which in turn has been replaced by Explorer Scouts and Scout Network. There are other Scouting organizations (mainly the British Boy Scouts and British Girl Scouts Association, Baden-Powell Scouts Association, European Scout Federation (British Association) and Pathfinder Scouts Association), which are not affiliated to the World Organization of the Scout Movement, who do have a Rover Scout section.

Rovering began in 1918 in the UK, ten years after the start of the Scouting program. After a rough start, due in large part to the effects of the First World War, the Rover Scout program began to grow. Over 2000 Rover Scouts were in attendance when the Prince of Wales, later Edward VIII, visited a Rover event in Westminster Hall in the Palace of Westminster in November 1926.

By 1931, Rovering had established itself internationally to the extent that the first World Rover Moot was organised in 1931 at Kandersteg, Switzerland.

Initially, the age range for Rover Scout membership was not precisely specified. In 1921 the Conference of Rover Scouts stated that 'A Rover Scout is usually a Senior Scout aged 17 years and over'. In 1956 the upper age range was fixed at 24.

Original programme and badges 
In the 1920s, the progress badges of Rover Scouts (then known as "special proficiency badges") were not too different from the Scout section - Rover Scouts wore a First Class badge and the King's Scout badge that had red trim, together with their proficiency badges. In addition, they were qualified to achieve and wear the Rambler Badge (metal version) on the left epaulette and the Rover Instructor badge.

In the 1930s, the number of badges were greatly reduced- no more First Class badge, King's Scout badge or proficiency badges. A Rover was only entitled to wear only two badges - the Rambler and the Rover Instructor. After World War II, even the Rover Instructor was not issued for a brief period. The situation improved after 1948 when the "Plan for Rover Scouts" introduced the "Progress Badge", initially a lanyard worn on the right shirt pocket, but later changed to a cloth emblem to be worn on the right epaulette.

In a bid to rescue the flagging Rovering section, The Scout Association introduced a new organisation and training scheme in 1956, where new badges were launched to attract new members. Queen's Scouts were entitled to wear a miniature replica on their left sleeves (or the Airman's badge/Seaman's badge or Bushman's Thong under the right epaulette, but not together with the Queen's Scout badge replica) before they qualified for the highest award in the Rover section - the Baden-Powell Award (a special epaulette worn on the left shoulder).

Present day 
All of the badges are now historic in The Scout Association, with the exception of the Queen's Scout Award, following their discontinuation of the Rover Scout programme.

In 2003 The Scout Association introduced the Scout Network, aimed at a similar age range (18 to 25) to the former Rover Scouts.

Baden-Powell Scouts' Association 

The Baden-Powell Scouts' Association instituted a Rover programme upon its founding in 1970.  Rovering remains one of the five Scout sections in their association, open to all adults over the age of 18.

United States

Boy Scouts of America 

In the United States, a Rovering program was introduced by the Boy Scouts of America (BSA) in 1935, as part of a group of a “Senior Scout” division for boys 15 and older.  The program was consolidated into "Explorer Scouts" in 1949, with a top age of 21 established in 1971. This program was redesigned as the Venturing program in the 1990s and is open to ages 14 through 20. The BSA does not sanction an adult Scouting program.

Baden-Powell Service Association 

One group maintaining a Rovering legacy in the United States is the Baden-Powell Service Association. It is open to all Scouts eighteen years of age and over, and has no upper age limit.  The BPSA was originally founded as a Rovering program before branching out into youth Scouting.

See also

 Ranger (Girl Guide)

References

Scouting